The Silence Sellers is a 1917 American silent drama film, directed by Burton King. It stars Olga Petrova, Mahlon Hamilton, and Wyndham Standing, and was released on September 24, 1917.

Cast list
Olga Petrova as Laura Sutphen
Mahlon Hamilton as Donald Loring
Wyndham Standing as Von Kolnitz
Violet Reed as Sue Schuyler
Charles Dungan as John Sutphen
Miles McCarthy as Walter Schuyler
Henry Leone as Hoffman
Edward James as Butler

References

External links 
 
 
 

American black-and-white films
Silent American drama films
American silent feature films
Metro Pictures films
Films directed by Burton L. King
1917 drama films
1917 films
1910s English-language films
1910s American films